Pierre Antoine Laloy (16 January 1749 – 16 March 1846) was a French politician who was a President of the National Convention from 6 November 1793 until 21 November 1793.

References 

1749 births
1846 deaths
Presidents of the National Convention